Pablo Cedano Cedano (25 January 1936 – 19 November 2018) was a Dominican Republic Roman Catholic bishop.

Biography 
Cedano Cedano was born in the Dominican Republic and was ordained to the priesthood in 1967. He served as titular bishop of Vita and as auxiliary bishop of the Roman Catholic Archdiocese of Santo Domingo, Dominican Republic, from 1996 until 2013.

Notes

1936 births
2018 deaths
20th-century Roman Catholic bishops in the Dominican Republic
21st-century Roman Catholic bishops in the Dominican Republic
Dominican Republic Roman Catholic bishops
Roman Catholic bishops of Santo Domingo